Snir Mishan (born 13 November 1988) is an Israeli footballer who currently plays for Hapoel Ashkelon.

Career
Mishan was brought up through the ranks of Maccabi Haifa and made his first team debut on 28 February 2007, in a Toto Cup match., but didn't appear in any other senior matches for the club, instead joining Hapoel Ra'anana in 2008.

With Mishan, Hapoel Ra'anana won promotion to the Israel Premier League, and as in the following season, Mishan returned to Liga Leumit to play with Maccabi Ironi Bat Yam and Hapoel Kfar Saba. In 2012, Mishan signed with Hapoel Acre and made his Premier League debut on 15 September 2012, against Bnei Sakhnin. After three seasons with Hapoel Acre, Mishan transferred to Beitar Jerusalem in summer 2015.

Mishan represented Israel with the national U-19 team and U-17 team and was part of the U-17 team in the 2005 UEFA European Under-17 Championship, playing in all of the team's matches in the championship.

References

External links
 
 

1988 births
Living people
Israeli footballers
Maccabi Haifa F.C. players
Hapoel Ra'anana A.F.C. players
Maccabi Ironi Bat Yam F.C. players
Hapoel Kfar Saba F.C. players
Hapoel Acre F.C. players
Beitar Jerusalem F.C. players
Hapoel Ashkelon F.C. players
Liga Leumit players
Israeli Premier League players
Footballers from Nahariya
People from Nahariya
Association football defenders